Colter Butte is a  summit located in the Grand Canyon in Coconino County of northern Arizona, US. Its neighbors include Brady Peak, 2.5 miles to the west-northwest, Alsap Butte two miles to the northwest, and Swilling Butte one-half mile to the east. Colter Butte is named after James G. H. Colter (1844–1922), born in Nova Scotia, Canada, he came to the Arizona Territory in 1872 as a pioneer, farmer, cattleman, Apache and desperado fighter. He was the father of Arizona state senator Fred Colter. This geographical feature's name was officially adopted in 1932 by the United States Board on Geographic Names. According to the Köppen climate classification system, Colter Butte is located in a cold semi-arid climate zone. This butte is composed of Pennsylvanian-Permian Supai Group which overlays cliff-forming Mississippian Redwall Limestone, which in turn overlays slope-forming Cambrian Tonto Group. Precipitation runoff from this feature drains east to the Colorado River via Nankoweap Creek on the north side and Kwagunt Creek from the south slope.

See also
 Geology of the Grand Canyon area

References

External links 

 Weather forecast: National Weather Service
 Colter Butte photo by Harvey Butchart
 1910 Photograph/portrait of James G.H. Colter

Grand Canyon
Landforms of Coconino County, Arizona
Buttes of Arizona
North American 2000 m summits
Colorado Plateau
Grand Canyon National Park